Centropogon uncinatus is a species of plant in the family Campanulaceae. It is endemic to Ecuador.

References

Flora of Ecuador
uncinatus
Critically endangered plants
Taxonomy articles created by Polbot